Burmaster is a surname. Notable people with the surname include:

Elizabeth Burmaster (born 1954), American educator
Jack Burmaster (1926–2005), American basketball player and coach
Milton F. Burmaster (1905–?), American politician